The Constitution of Burkina Faso provides for freedom of religion, and the Government generally respects this right in practice. Government policy contributes to the generally free practice of religion. There were no reports of societal abuses or discrimination based on religious belief or practice; however, at times community members forced old women falsely accused of being witches to flee their villages.

Religious demography

While exact statistics on religious affiliation are not available and vary widely, the Government estimated in its most recent census (1996) that approximately 60 percent of the population practice Islam, and that the majority of this group belong to the Sunni branch. The Government also estimated that 24 percent of the population maintains traditional indigenous beliefs, 17 percent practices Roman Catholicism, and 3 percent are members of various Protestant denominations. Statistics on religious affiliation are approximate because incorporating traditional indigenous beliefs and practices is widespread among both Christians and Muslims.

Muslims reside largely around the northern, eastern, and western borders, while Christians live in the center of the country. People practice traditional indigenous religious beliefs throughout the country, especially in rural communities. Most ethnic groups are religiously heterogeneous, although the Fulani and Dioula communities are overwhelmingly Muslim.

Status of religious freedom

Legal and policy framework
Article 31 of the Constitution states that "Burkina Faso is a democratic, unitary and secular State".

The Constitution provides for freedom of religion, and the Government generally respected this right in practice. The Government at all levels sought to protect this right in full and did not tolerate its abuse, either by governmental or private actors.

The Constitution and laws protect the right of individuals to choose and change their religion and provide the right to practice the religion of one's choice. The Government observes and enforces these provisions. The country is a secular state. Islam, Christianity, and traditional indigenous religious beliefs were practiced freely without government interference. There is no official state religion, and the Government neither subsidized nor favored any particular religion. The practice of a particular religion was not known to confer any advantage or disadvantage in the political arena, the civil service, the military, or the private sector.

The Government establishes the following religious holy days as national holidays: Eid al-Adha, Easter Monday, Ascension Day, the Birth of the Prophet Muhammad, Assumption Day, All Saints' Day, Ramadan, and Christmas Day.

The Government requires all organizations, religious or otherwise, to register with the Ministry of Territorial Administration. Registration confers legal status, but it entails no specific controls or benefits. According to article 45 of the Freedom of Association Code, failure to register may result in a fine of approximately $97 to $292 (50,000 CFA to 150,000 CFA). The Government gives all religious groups equal access to registration and routinely approves their applications. The Government taxes religious groups only if they engage in commercial activities, such as farming and dairy production.

The Constitution provides freedom of expression in publications and broadcasts, including those by religious groups, unless the judicial system determines that such expression is harming public order or committing slander; the judicial system has never made such a determination. The Government did not deny a publishing or broadcasting license to any religious group that requested one during the period covered by this report.

Religious organizations operate under the same regulatory framework for publishing and broadcasting rights as other entities. The Ministry of Security has the right to request samples of proposed publications and broadcasts to verify that they are in accordance with the stated nature of the religious group; however, there were no reports that religious broadcasters experienced difficulties with this regulation. Additionally, the Government does not grant special tax preferences to religious organizations operating print or broadcast media.

Foreign missionary groups operate freely and face few, if any, restrictions; however, missionary groups occasionally faced complicated bureaucratic procedures in pursuit of particular activities.

Public schools do not offer religious instruction. Muslim, Catholic, and Protestant groups operate primary and secondary schools. Although school officials have to submit the names of their directors to the Government and register their schools, religious or otherwise, the Government does not appoint or approve these officials.

The Government does not fund religious schools or require them to pay taxes unless they conduct for-profit activities. The Government reviews the curriculum of religious schools to ensure that they offer the full standard academic curriculum. The Government, however, does not interfere with the curriculum of supplemental classes offered by private schools, such as classes on the Bible or the Qur'an.

The government taxes religious groups only if they engage in commercial activities, such as farming or dairy production.

Restrictions on religious freedom
Government policy and practice contributed to the generally free practice of religion.

There were no reports of religious prisoners or detainees in the country.

Forced religious conversion
There were no reports of forced religious conversion, including of minor U.S. citizens who had been abducted or illegally removed from the United States, or of the refusal to allow such citizens to be returned to the United States.

Homosexuality

Homosexual activity is legal in Burkina Faso, and the country has neither passed a law prohibiting such activity nor has ever criminalized it.

Societal abuses and discrimination
There were no reports of societal abuses or discrimination based on religious belief or practice; however, at times community members forced old women falsely accused of being witches to flee their villages. The Catholic Church funded-Delwende Center that houses and feeds women accused of witchcraft reported seven cases of this kind. The Ministry of Social Action and National Solidarity, along with various other nongovernmental and religious organizations, also maintained similar shelters in Ouagadougou.

Some Muslims considered the 1996 law against female genital mutilation (FGM) as discriminating against their religious practices and continued performing the procedure. Sometimes non-Muslim FGM practitioners performed the procedure during baptismal ceremonies because the baby was expected to cry during the ceremony.

Unlike in previous reports, there were no reports of tensions within sectors of the Muslim community during the period covered by this report.

References

 United States Bureau of Democracy, Human Rights and Labor. Burkina Faso: International Religious Freedom Report 2007. This article incorporates text from this source, which is in the public domain.

Burkina Faso
Religion in Burkina Faso
Human rights in Burkina Faso